FC Sopron was a Hungarian football club from the town of Sopron, near the Austrian border. It was founded in 1921 as Soproni Postás. The club's home stadium is Stadion Városi with a capacity of 5,300.

With the beginning of the season 2007/08 Lajos Détári was appointed for being the head coach. After Antonio Righi bought the club Détári was fired (without getting paid for his work) and replaced by now head coach Vincenzo Cosco. In January 2008 their license was withdrawn by the league over unpaid taxes and payments. It was agreed that they would remain in 1. Liga for 2007/08 with 0 points for the season, all points being awarded to their opponents. It finally went to bankruptcy and was dissolved. It was replaced with newly founded Soproni VSE and climbed to NB II after winning Bakony Group of NB III in 2010–11 season.

Ownership
The club, which as commercial entity is called AZ FC Sopron Futball Sportszolgáltató KFT., is 79% owned by Antonio Righi. He bought the club from László Máriusz Vizer in 2007. 21% of the club are held by Sopron MJV Önkormányzata.

2008 January
The club was dissolved in January 2008.

Achievements
The club won the Hungarian Cup in 2005.

Naming history
  1921: Sopron   Soproni Sport Egyesület
  1945: Soproni Postás   Soproni Postás Sport Egyesület
  1991: Soproni TSE   Soproni Távközlési Sport Egyesület
  1994: MATÁV Sopron   Magyar Távközlési Vállalat Sport Club Sopron
  1998: MATÁV Sopron   Magyar Távközlési Vállalat Football Club Sopron
 2000: MATÁV Compaq Sopron   Magyar Távközlési Vállalat Football Club Compaq Sopron
 2002: MATÁV Sopron   Magyar Távközlési Vállalat Football Club Sopron
 2005: Sopron   Football Club Sopron
 2008: ------

European cup history

UEFA Intertoto Cup

UEFA Cup

External links
 Official website

 
Sopron, FC
Defunct football clubs in Hungary
1921 establishments in Hungary
2008 disestablishments in Hungary
Association football clubs established in 1921